The 2021–22 season is Brescia Leonessa's 13th in existence and the club's 7th consecutive season in the top tier Italian basketball.

Kit 
Supplier: Errea / Sponsor: Germani

Players

Current roster

Depth chart

Squad changes

In 

|}

Out

|}

Confirmed 

|}

Coach

Competitions

Supercup

Serie A

References 

Brescia Leonessa